Czeczewo  is a village in the administrative district of Gmina Radzyń Chełmiński, within Grudziądz County, Kuyavian-Pomeranian Voivodeship, in north-central Poland.

The village has a population of 301.

References

Czeczewo